Passiflora discophora is a species of plant In the family Passifloraceae, native to western Ecuador and Colombia. It is restricted to closed wet coastal forest, and considered endangered due to the rapid ongoing deforestation of Ecuador's coast.

Description

Adhesive pads 
It is highly unusual among the genus Passiflora in regard of its climbing strategy. Unlike most other members of the genus, it forms branched tendrils with terminal adhesive pads. After surface contact of the tendrils, multiple adhesive pads are formed by papillate cell proliferation of the apex and a callus is formed, which perfectly reflects the microtopology of the substrate. In addition adhesive substances are secreted, which ensures persisting anchorage even after the tissue has died. The tendrils coil after adhesion, providing a firm support to the climbing plant. The functional principles of these structures have been used as inspiration for engineering of similar materials.

References

 

discophora
Flora of Ecuador
Flora of Colombia
Endangered plants
Taxonomy articles created by Polbot